The 48th Annual Martín Fierro Awards, presented by the Asociación de Periodistas de la Televisión y Radiofonía Argentina (APTRA), was held on June 3, 2018. It was held at the  located in the Puerto Madero neighbourhood of Buenos Aires. During the ceremony, APTRA announced the Martín Fierro Awards for 2017 Argentine television and radio programs. The ceremony was hosted by Marley and was broadcast on Telefe. Telefe had last broadcast the awards show in 2013; the previous four award ceremonies had been broadcast by eltrece.

The shortlists were announced on May 8 on the  program.

The singer Lali Espósito opened the ceremony with a musical act, performing the songs; "100 Grados", "Tu Novia" and "Una Na".

Awards
Winners are listed first and highlighted in boldface. Other nominations are listed in alphabetic order.

{| class=wikitable
|-
! style="background:#EEDD82; width:50%" | Best daily fiction
! style="background:#EEDD82; width:50%" | Best miniseries
|-
| valign="top" |
 Las Estrellas
 Amar después de amar
 Cuéntame cómo pasó
| valign="top" |
 
 
 
|-
! style="background:#EEDD82; width:50%" | Best lead actor in daily fiction
! style="background:#EEDD82; width:50%" | Best lead actress in daily fiction
|-
| valign="top" |
 Esteban Lamothe (for Las Estrellas)
  (for Amar después de amar)
 Nicolás Cabré (for Cuéntame cómo pasó)
| valign="top" |
 Violeta Urtizberea (for Las Estrellas)
  (for Las Estrellas)
 Eleonora Wexler (for Amar después de amar & Golpe al corazón)
|-
! style="background:#EEDD82; width:50%" | Best lead actor in miniseries
! style="background:#EEDD82; width:50%" | Best lead actress in miniseries
|-
| valign="top" |
 Luis Brandoni (for )
 Julio Chávez (for )
 Peter Lanzani (for )
| valign="top" |
 Eva De Dominici (for )
 Eleonora Wexler (for )
  (for )
|-
! style="background:#EEDD82; width:50%" | Best supporting actor
! style="background:#EEDD82; width:50%" | Best supporting actress
|-
| valign="top" |
 Luis Luque (for )
 Carlos Belloso (for Quiero vivir a tu lado)
 Nicolás Francella (for Las Estrellas])
| valign="top" |
 Luz Cipriota (for )
  (for Las Estrellas])
 Julieta Ortega (for )
|-
! style="background:#EEDD82; width:50%" | Best writer
! style="background:#EEDD82; width:50%" | Best newcomer
|-
| valign="top" |
 Bruno Stagnaro &  (for )
  &  (for Amar después de amar)
 &  (for )
| valign="top" |
  (for )
 Carla Quevedo (for )
  (for Quiero vivir a tu lado)
|-
! style="background:#EEDD82; width:50%" | Best humoristic program
! style="background:#EEDD82; width:50%" | Best cultural/educational TV program
|-
| valign="top" |
 Polémica en el bar
 NotiCampi
 Peter Capusotto y sus videos
| valign="top" |
 Ambiente y medio
 Noticias de ayer
 
|-
! style="background:#EEDD82; width:50%" | Best sports program
! style="background:#EEDD82; width:50%" | Best musical program
|-
| valign="top" |
 
 Arena extreme
 
| valign="top" |
 
 Conciertos en el CCK
 Ojos de videotape
|-
! style="background:#EEDD82; width:50%" | Best male journalist
! style="background:#EEDD82; width:50%" | Best female journalist
|-
| valign="top" |
 Facundo Pastor (for )
 Reynaldo Sietecase (for Telefe Noticias)
 Nicolás Wiñazki (for Telenoche)
| valign="top" |
 Mariana Contartessi (for )
 Gisela Busaniche (for Telefe Noticias)
  (for Animales Sueltos)
|-
! style="background:#EEDD82; width:50%" | Best journalistic program
! style="background:#EEDD82; width:50%" | Best news reporter
|-
| valign="top" |
 
 
 La cornisa
 Periodismo para todos
| valign="top" |
  (for Telefe Noticias)
 Dominique Metzger (for Telenoche)
 Valeria Sampedro (for Arriba Argentinos & )
|-
! style="background:#EEDD82; width:50%" | Best panelist
! style="background:#EEDD82; width:50%" | Best TV program for kids
|-
| valign="top" |
  (for )
  (for Despedida de Solteros)
 Mauro Szeta (for )
| valign="top" |
 Piñón en familia Divina, está en tu corazón El universo de Lourdes|-
! style="background:#EEDD82; width:50%" | Best TV News
! style="background:#EEDD82; width:50%" | Best entertaining program
|-
| valign="top" |
 Telefe noticias a las 20 América noticias - Segunda edición  Televisión Pública noticias a las 21| valign="top" |
 Susana Giménez A todo o nada Combate|-
! style="background:#EEDD82; width:50%" | Best reality show
! style="background:#EEDD82; width:50%" | Best general interest program
|-
| valign="top" |
 Showmatch  | valign="top" |
  La noche de Mirtha Legrand |-
! style="background:#EEDD82; width:50%" | Best magazine
! style="background:#EEDD82; width:50%" | Best work in humor
|-
| valign="top" |
   El diario de Mariana| valign="top" |
  (for )
 Martín Campilongo (for NotiCampi & Peligro: sin codificar)
|-
! style="background:#EEDD82; width:50%" | Best male TV host
! style="background:#EEDD82; width:50%" | Best female TV host
|-
| valign="top" |
 Guido Kaczka (for A todo o nada,  & Lo mejor de la familia)
 Santiago del Moro (for Intratables)
 Marcelo Tinelli (for Showmatch)
 Alejandro Wiebe (for Despedida de Solteros,  & The Wall: Construye tu vida)
| valign="top" |
 Susana Gimenez (for Susana Giménez)
 Mariana Fabbiani (for El diario de Mariana)
 Verónica Lozano (for )
|-
! style="background:#EEDD82; width:50%" | Best director
! style="background:#EEDD82; width:50%" | Best general production
|-
| valign="top" |
 Bruno Stagnaro (for )
 Daniel Barone (for )
  & Daniel Galimberti (for Cuéntame cómo pasó)
| valign="top" |
 Susana Giménez
 Showmatch |-
! style="background:#EEDD82; width:50%" | Best advertisement
! style="background:#EEDD82; width:50%" | Best opening theme
|-
| valign="top" |
 El vino, la primera red social (by Liebre Amotinada for Fondo Vitivinícola de Mendoza)
 Casa (by FCB&Fire for Poett Fraganza)
 Estamos más cerca de lo que creemos	 (by Grey Argentina for Coca-Cola)
| valign="top" |
 Los sueños del ayer (by Alejandro Lerner for Cuéntame cómo pasó)
 El baile de la vida (by Eric Bobo for )
 La Leona (by Daniela Herrero for Las Estrellas)
|-
! style="background:#EEDD82; width:50%" | Martín Fierro Award: Lifetime Achievement
! style="background:#EEDD82; width:50%" | Martín Fierro Award: People's Award
|-
| valign="top" |
 Mirtha Legrand  (For the 50th anniversary of )
| valign="top" |
 Susana Giménez
|-
! style="background:#EEDD82; width:50%" | Golden Martín Fierro Award
! style="background:#EEDD82; width:50%" | 
|-
| valign="top" |
 | valign="top" |
|-
|}

In Memoriam
As is tradition an in memoriam segment tribute was paid to the artists who had died between June 2017 and June 2018. The Mexican singer Carlos Rivera sang the Academy Award for Best Original Song winner "Remember Me" from the Disney movie Coco'', while the images of the deceased artists were shown.

References

2017 in Argentine television
2018 in Argentina
2018 television awards
Argentina culture-related lists